Texola is a genus of butterflies found from southern United States to Mexico in the family Nymphalidae.

Species
Listed alphabetically:
Texola anomalus (Godman & Salvin, 1897) – anomalous checkerspot (Mexico)
Texola elada (Hewitson, 1868) – Elada checkerspot (Mexico, Texas, Arizona)

References

Melitaeini
Nymphalidae of South America
Butterfly genera
Taxa named by Robert P. Higgins